Rex Varghese (died 22 January 2013) was an Indian bodybuilder who became the first Keralite to win the Mr India title in the 90 kg category in 2007. He also had Junior Mr India, Mr Kerala, Muscleman of Kerala, Mr Kerala Olympia titles to his credit.

Background
He was born to Varghese and Mary in a middle-class family. He became Sub Junior Mr Thrissur at the age of 16. Hailing from Mambra, Koratty, Thrissur.

Career
Won the titles,
Junior Mr India 2001 Jaipur
Mr India
Mr Kerala
Muscleman of Kerala
Mr Kerala Olympia
He was working as a travelling ticket examiner (TTE) with the Railways. He was unemployed in his last days.

Death
Rex Varghese committed suicide in his house at Koratty on 22 January 2013. He was a bachelor.

References

Indian bodybuilders
Year of birth missing
2013 deaths
People from Thrissur district
Sportspeople from Thrissur
Suicides by hanging in India